Nowe Warpno Bay (Polish:Zatoka Nowowarpieńska) – a bay located in the southern part of the Szczecin Lagoon. The bay separates the land of the Wkrzańska Lowland. The southern waters of the bay are linked with the Nowe Warpno Lake. From the north, the bay is separated from the Szczecin Lagoon by the Łysa Island and the Nowe Warpno Peninsula. Between the lake and the lagoon is located the Nowe Warpno Peninsula, on which the town of Nowe Warpno is located with a port. On the north-western coast of the bay is located the village of Altwarp (Stare Warpno).

References 

Baltic Sea
Bays of Germany
Bays of Poland
Germany–Poland border
International lakes of Europe
Lagoons of Mecklenburg-Western Pomerania
Landforms of West Pomeranian Voivodeship